Aquib Nazir is an Indian cricketer. He made his first-class debut for Jammu & Kashmir in the 2017–18 Ranji Trophy on 9 November 2017.

References

External links
 

Year of birth missing (living people)
Living people
Indian cricketers
Place of birth missing (living people)
Jammu and Kashmir cricketers